The Legend of Red Horse Cavern is the first novel in the World of Adventure series by Gary Paulsen. It was first published on September 1, 1994 by Yearling.

Plot
Apache Will Little Bear Tucker and his friend Sarah Thompson spot a treasure chest, get held captive by the villains and later escape. After Sarah is recaptured, Will rescues her, they solve the legend of Red Horse and Will disposes of a villain.

Novels by Gary Paulsen
1994 American novels
American young adult novels
American adventure novels